Beneh Kohol (also known as Nebeh Kohol) is a village in Ujan-e Gharbi Rural District, in the Central District of Bostanabad County, East Azerbaijan Province, Iran. At the 2006 census, its population was 646, in 143 families.

References 

Populated places in Bostanabad County